Michael Kagan is an American actor.

Career 
He has guest starred in number of notable television series, including Lois & Clark: The New Adventures of Superman, Babylon 5, Step by Step, Seinfeld, ER, Tracey Takes On..., Star Trek: Voyager, The Practice, How I Met Your Mother, The King of Queens, The West Wing, Desperate Housewives and other series.

From 2006 to 2010, he had a recurring role as talk show host Colin Lassiter on the Disney Channel sitcom Hannah Montana. In 2011, he appeared in the Disney Channel film Good Luck Charlie, It's Christmas!. He has also done a number of stage productions, prior to appearing on film and television. In 2007, he performed in a play entitled Leap.

Filmography

Film

Television

References

External links

20th-century American male actors
21st-century American male actors
American male film actors
American male stage actors
American male television actors
Living people
Place of birth missing (living people)
1944 births